Lesbian, gay, bisexual and transgender (LGBT) rights in Laos go unreported and unnoticed. While homosexuality is legal in Laos, it is very difficult to assess the current state of acceptance and violence that LGBT people face because of government interference. Numerous claims have suggested that Laos is one of the most tolerant communist states. Despite such claims, discrimination still exists. Laos provides no anti-discrimination protections for LGBT people, nor does it prohibit hate crimes based on sexual orientation and gender identity. Households headed by same-sex couples are not eligible for any of the rights that opposite-sex married couples enjoy, as neither same-sex marriage nor civil unions are legal.

Legality of same-sex sexual activity
Same-sex sexual activity is legal in Laos, and is not believed to have ever being criminalized. Having been a colony of France, Laos never inherited anti-gay laws, unlike former British colonies. The age of consent is 15, regardless of sex or sexual orientation.

Recognition of same-sex relationships 
Laos does not recognize same-sex marriages, nor any other form of same-sex unions. There are no known debates surrounding the legalization of such unions.

Discrimination protections
Currently, there are no laws prohibiting discrimination based on sexual orientation, and the national Constitution of Laos does not expressly address sexual orientation or gender identity issues.

On 21 January 2020, at the 35th Session - Universal Periodic Review at UN Human Rights Council, there was the recommendation on The Sexual Orientation and Gender Identity Expression (SOGIE-LGBTI) From H.E Christopher Grima - Ambassador and Permanent Representative of Malta to the United Nations Office in Geneva to the delegation of Lao PDR to: "Continue taking steps to improve the rights of lesbian, gay, bisexual, transgender and intersex persons, particularly by identifying their needs, and consider involving lesbian, gay, bisexual, transgender and intersex representatives in decision-making processes."

In addition, there was a recommendation from H.E Harald Aspelund, Ambassador, Permanent Mission of Iceland to the United Nations in Geneva, to the delegation of Lao PDR to: "Adopt comprehensive anti-discrimination legislation that addresses direct and indirect discrimination and encompasses all the prohibited grounds of discrimination, including sexual orientation and gender identity."

Living conditions
In 2013, the United States Department of State reported that "societal discrimination based on sexual orientation and against persons with HIV/AIDS" was prevalent. LGBT life in Laos has been described as "invisible", though has seen increased visibility in recent years. The Government of Laos has also taken steps in recent years to include gay men and transgender people in its National Strategy And Action Plan for HIV/AIDS prevention.

Theravada Buddhism is the most predominant religion in Laos. LGBT activist Anan Bouapha has stated, "Many people might think that Laos is conservative and extremely close-minded when it comes to LGBT issues. Realistically, our culture and mentality seem to be quite open-minded to people from all walks of life. I have seen many transgender people wearing traditional costumes to temples, attending traditional ceremonies and some gay students expressing [their] identity among [their] peers and teachers."

Groups and organisations
Non-governmental organizations (NGOs) are permitted to organize and campaign in Laos, but are under constant state-supervision. Phil Robertson, deputy director for Asia at Human Rights Watch, has said, "The Laotian government has never really been very friendly towards NGOs, and has forced them as well as other development partners sent by the UN to cooperate with state-controlled organizations. The Laotian leadership does place much value on transparency or dialogue with civil society." Nevertheless, "Proud To Be Us Laos" was founded in 2012 as the country's first LGBT association. Founded by Anan Bouapha (ອານັນ ບົວພາ), then aged 25, the group organized the first LGBT Pride in Laos in June 2012. The group has begun to receive several officials and government members attending their events.

Culture, events and media
Gay foreigners visiting Laos in the 1990s sometimes reported the existence of a taboo associated with foreigners that made it hard to interact with Laotians, except discreetly at night. The Government of Laos has blocked access to LGBT themed webpages in the past and discussions about LGBT issues in the media are rare, beyond transsexuals who are quite visible in the culture as entertainment. However, it does generally tolerate, or simply ignore, LGBT people unless they campaign for LGBT rights or are judged to be too publicly "immodest or indecent". Tolerance for LGBT people is, as is often the case, stronger in the urban cities than in the rural neighborhoods. In 2014, a decree was issued prohibiting criticism of all government policies.

The Communist Government has allowed certain public health non-governmental organizations to work with the LGBT community. Community Health and Inclusion Association (CHias Laos), formerly known as Lao Positive Health Association (LAOPHA), founded in 1999, promotes HIV/AIDS education to many different segments of Lao society, including men who have sex with men.

The first public LGBT Pride in Laos was held in June 2012 on the sports field of the U.S. embassy in Vientiane, with 100 participants; the guests of honor were U.S. Ambassador to Laos Karen Stewart and Dr. Bounpheng Philavong, director of the Center for HIV/AIDS/STI (CHAS) at the Lao Ministry of Health. The event was organized by Laotian and intergovernmental organizations, including the Purple Sky Network, Lao Positive Health Association, Population Services International, the Burnet Institute, Family Health International, the Vientiane Youth Center for Health and Development, and UNFPA.

In 2015, Proud to be Us Laos marked the first International Day Against Homophobia, Transphobia and Biphobia (IDAHOT) in Laos with support from the European Union. Lattavanh Sengdala became the first transgender advocate to appear on national television speaking of her experience as a transwoman in Laos. The IDAHOT celebration was also reported on Lao National Television, a governmental TV channel. In 2016, the European Union again supported the organising of the second IDAHOT celebration, where more diplomatic and civil society partners participated. Proud to be Us Laos also partnered with one of the UK's leading LGBT rights organisation, Stonewall.

In 2017, the British, Australian, American and Canadian embassies, in partnership with Proud to be Us Laos, hosted a reception in Vientiane. Chargé d'Affairs of the Canadian Embassy Lee-Anne Hermann said, "Today, let us unite in this global celebration of diversity and community. A coming together to share experiences and stories to deepen our understanding and appreciation of LGBTI persons and their contributions to society." The event was also attended by some representatives from the Lao Ministry of Foreign Affairs.

In 2018, four more embassies participated in the advocacy campaign, namely France, Germany, Switzerland and Luxembourg. The Australian embassy wrote a Facebook post about LGBT issues in Laos. The U.S embassy organised a small panel discussion with partners and Lao audience at the American Centre.

IDAHOT 2019 was organised at the Australian embassy in Vientiane on 17 May. The event was attended by 15 embassies, staff from local Lao civil society organizations, international NGOs, and many others.

In August 2019, Anan Bouapha, Founder/President of Proud To Be Us Laos, was named as one of the Grand Marshals of the Montreal Pride along with: LGBTQ+ activist and athlete Val Desjardins, advocate and M. Cuir Montréal 2011 Dany Godbout, author and activist Ma-Nee Chacaby, creator of the trans flag Monica Helms, actor and advocate Wilson Cruz. They were welcomed by Justin Trudeau, Prime Minister of Canada.

On 19 December 2019, "Being LGBT At Work (A STUDY OF LGBTI PERSONS IN THE WORKPLACE IN LAO PDR)", conducted by the Faculty of Law and Political Science at the National University of Laos, the Law and Development Partnership and Proud to Be Us Laos, was officially presented at the Annual Legal Research Forum 2019. Proud to Be Us Laos said in a statement: "Civil society could refer [to it] as data evidence on related laws and policy. It also can be used as [an] advocacy tool with partners from both [the] government, [NGOs] and internationally appropriately." Additionally, the "Pride At Work" Poster Project, a Canada funded project implemented by Proud To Be Us Laos in collaboration with the Faculty of Law and Political Science, was also launched that same day. Several Lao celebrities have expressed support for the project, including Aluna Thavonsouk (well-known Lao singer and former goodwill ambassador of the Food and Agriculture Organization of the United Nations (FAO)), Kai Nangpaya (host of the popular Pineapple Chit-Chat), Inthy Deuansavanh (businessman and founder of the Inthira Group of hotels and restaurants), Dr. Ponsinh Phithavong Boutkaska "Toto" (model and coach for Miss World Laos), Souliyan Lounchantha (head of the Clinical Legal Education Program in Lao PDR at the Faculty of Law and Political Science), and Olam Rasaphonh (prominent transgender activist). The Pride At Work ambassadors participated in a poster shooting and short video project with their personal messages to encourage Lao society "to open their heart and mind to ensure that employment in Laos focuses on people's abilities, competence and merits regardless of their gender, sexual orientation, disability, ethnicity or race."

Summary table

See also

Human rights in Laos
LGBT rights in Asia

References

Human rights in Laos
Laos
Political movements in Laos
Law of Laos
LGBT in Laos